Sir John Blaket (died 1430) was the member of Parliament for the constituency of Leicestershire for the parliaments of 1407, 1410, and April 1414. He was also the member for Gloucestershire for the parliament of December 1421.

References 

Members of the Parliament of England for Gloucestershire
Year of birth unknown
1430 deaths
Members of the Parliament of England for Leicestershire
English knights
English MPs 1407
English MPs 1410
English MPs April 1414
English MPs December 1421